Howard Satterwhite (born May 24, 1953) is a former American football wide receiver. He played for the New York Jets in 1976 and for the Baltimore Colts in 1977.

References

1953 births
Living people
American football wide receivers
Sam Houston Bearkats football players
New York Jets players
Baltimore Colts players